State Route 893 is a state highway in White Pine County, Nevada.

Major intersections

See also

References

893
Transportation in White Pine County, Nevada